Bharathnagar is a well planned residential layout in the city of Bangalore, India. Bharathnagar is divided into Phase 1 & 2. Phase 2 is the larger of the two and has the capacity to accommodate 4000 independent homes, whereas Phase 1 can accommodate 2,000 homes. Bharathnagar was carved out of the larger village of Byadarahalli.

Bharathnagar, which was till recently managed by the Residents Welfare Association, is now under the management of Bruhat Bengaluru Mahanagara Palike (BBMP). This has increased development activities in the region, with five new beautifully landscaped parks being established.

East West Group of Institutions is located behind Bharathnagar Phase 1. Confederation of Indian Industry - Institute of Quality (CII - IQ) is located behind Bharathnagar Phase 2.

Karnataka Bank Herohalli Branch is located on 7th main road, Bharathnagar 2nd Phase.There are Canara and SBI Banks in the 1st Phase. This layout also has the popular Swathi Hotel in its 1st Phase. 241D is the direct BMTC bus route to Kempegowda Bus Station (Majestic) and 241N is the direct BMTC bus route to Krishnarajendra Market (KR City Market). This layout is equipped with Kaveri Water Connection. RoyalMart is the nearest shopping centre.

Schools and colleges
 East West Institute of Technology
 Euro Kids

References

Neighbourhoods in Bangalore